Allan Douglas Nicholson (April 26, 1936 – December 9, 1978) was a Canadian ice hockey left winger. Born in Estevan, Saskatchewan, he played in 19 games for the Boston Bruins during the 1955–56 and 1956–57 seasons and recorded one assist. The rest of his career, which lasted from 1955 to 1972, was mainly spent in the minor Western Hockey League.

Career statistics

Regular season and playoffs

Awards and achievements
WHL Championship (1963, 1964)

External links

Obituary at LostHockey.com

1936 births
1978 deaths
Boston Bruins players
Canadian ice hockey left wingers
Hershey Bears players
Humboldt Indians players
Ice hockey people from Saskatchewan
People from Estevan
San Diego Gulls (WHL) players
San Francisco Seals (ice hockey) players
Springfield Indians players
Vancouver Canucks (WHL) players
Winnipeg Warriors (minor pro) players